The City of Los Angeles posts neighborhood signs to identify the geographic boundaries of different neighborhoods.

LAist stated that these signs indicate “official L.A. neighborhood” designation and in 2008 estimated that Los Angeles had 185 neighborhoods with an official "blue sign”.

Design
 
The standard neighborhood sign is rectangular and features white letters on a blue background. The city seal is displayed on the sign.

Alternative colors and shapes are possible upon request provided they comply with federal and state law. Example: octagonal signs painted red are reserved for stop signs.

Process

The Los Angeles City Council adopted a policy on January 31, 2006 (Council File No. 02-0196), which provided a process to either change a neighborhood name or create one where none previously existed. A written application, including a petition, must be filed with the City Clerk to initiate the process. The application must have 500 signatures or, if the population of the neighborhood is less than 2,500 residents, then the petition should contain signatures from 20% of the population. A legal description (street boundaries) of the area must also be included. A map of the proposed area must be also attached. After concurrence from the local councilman's office, the neighborhood signs are then posted by the Los Angeles Department of Transportation (LADOT).

Timeline

Residents of Reseda Ranch gathered 500 signatures (out of a possible 650) to submit to the city.  The application was submitted to the city on January 17, 2007.  It was approved on December 7, 2007. In August 2008, City Councilman Dennis Zine attended the community’s unveiling of its new neighborhood sign.

Neighborhood leaders in Little Bangladesh organized residents for more than a year to lobby the Los Angeles City Council.  The designation was approved in 2010 and neighborhood signage was installed in 2011. The Little Bangladesh sign is located on Third Street and New Hampshire Avenue.

Fearing that the area would lose its Japanese-American identity, community leaders in West Los Angeles  petitioned the City Council to change the official name of their neighborhood to Sawtelle Japantown. The application was submitted to the city on December 1, 2014. On February 25, 2015, the City Council unanimously approved the neighborhood designation.  Announcing the naming, Bianca Barragan of Curbed.com wrote "Now that the it's been named, the next step is to get that big blue neighborhood sign up". The sign was installed on the corner of Olympic and Sawtelle Boulevards on March 29, 2015, the culmination of a year's effort.

Other types of signage
In addition the blue neighborhood signs, the city also offers signage for neighborhoods of historical significance and places of cultural significance (designated as such a federal or state agency or by resolution of the City Council.

References

External links

 LA City Neighborhood Signs on Flickr